Daniel Bernard may refer to:

 Daniel Bernard (academic) (died 1588), English clergyman and scholar
 Daniel Bernard (businessman) (born 1946), French businessman
 Daniel Bernard (politician) (born 1959), Canadian serving as Member of the National Assembly
 , Dutch war criminal, see Operation Silbertanne
 Daniel Bernard (diplomat) (1941–2004), French Ambassador to the United Kingdom
 Daniel Bernard Roumain (born 1970),American classically trained composer, performer, violinist and band-leader
 Daniel Bernard (footballer) (1949–2020), French footballer